John Childs may refer to:

Jack Childs, FBI spy within the U.S. Communist Party
John Childs (aviator), 18th century aviator
John Childs (cricketer) (born 1951), English cricketer
John Lewis Childs (1856–1921), horticultural businessman and politician who founded Floral Park, New York
John W. Childs, founder of J.W. Childs Associates
John Childs (murderer), British man convicted of six murders in 1979
John Filby Childs (1783–1853), English printer and political radical
John Childs (historian) (born 1949), professor of military history
John L. Childs (1899–1985), American educator and author
John Childs, victim of the 1995 kidnapping of Western tourists in Kashmir

See also
John Child (disambiguation)